This is a list of notable people with absolute pitch, or "perfect pitch".

Note for pre-19th century composers
Owing to uncertainty in the historical record, it is often impossible to determine whether composers and musicians of the past had absolute pitch. Since absolute pitch is rare in European musical culture, claims that any particular musician possessed it are difficult to evaluate. Among composers of the Baroque and Classical eras, evidence is available only for Mozart, who is documented to have demonstrated the ability at age 7. Experts have only surmised that Beethoven had it, as indicated from some excerpts from his letters. By the 19th century, it became more common for the presence of absolute pitch to be recorded, identifying the ability to be present in musicians such as Camille Saint-Saëns and John Philip Sousa.

List

References

Absolute pitch